"Sensitivity" is the title of a number-one single by American singer Ralph Tresvant. It was the first single from the self-titled debut album of the New Edition frontman since the split of the group. The hit song spent one week at number one on the US Billboard R&B chart, becoming his biggest hit. It also peaked at number four on the US Billboard Hot 100 and number eighteen on the UK Singles Chart.

Charts

Weekly charts

Year-end charts

Certifications

See also
 List of number-one R&B singles of 1990 (U.S.)

References

1990 songs
1990 debut singles
MCA Records singles
Music Week number-one dance singles
New jack swing songs
Ralph Tresvant songs
Song recordings produced by Jimmy Jam and Terry Lewis
Songs written by Jimmy Jam and Terry Lewis